"Ronan" is a charity single by American singer-songwriter Taylor Swift, released as an iTunes-exclusive download on September 8, 2012, through Big Machine Records. The lyrics are based on a blog by Phoenix-resident Maya Thompson about her three-year-old son Ronan, who died from neuroblastoma in 2011. Swift wrote and produced the song by putting together quotes from the blog, crediting Maya Thompson as co-writer. All proceeds from sales of the single were donated for charity causes to raise awareness of and fight against cancer.

Musically, "Ronan" is a soft rock ballad instrumented by a sole finger-picked guitar with occasional piano tunes and minimal drum brushes. Swift performed the song live only twice, first at the 2012 Stand Up to Cancer telethon. Music critics have lauded the song artistically, deeming it a prime example of Swift's abilities as a singer-songwriter to conjecture vivid emotional sentiments through her songwriting. The single peaked at number 16 on the US Billboard Hot 100 and was certified gold by the Recording Industry Association of America. A re-recorded version, "Ronan (Taylor's Version)", was included in Swift's 2021 album Red (Taylor's Version), a re-recording of her 2012 studio album.

Background
Swift wrote the song after reading Maya Thompson's blog. Thompson is the mother of three-year-old Ronan Thompson, who died in 2011 of neuroblastoma. He had been treated at Barrow Neurological Institute at Phoenix Children's Hospital. Maya began writing in August 2010 when Ronan was diagnosed and she continued penning her entries in the blog Rockstar Ronan during the nine months that Ronan suffered from the illness before dying in May 2011, just three days before his fourth birthday. Maya worked through her grief by continuing the blog, writing letters to her late son whilst raising money and awareness for childhood cancer causes.

The pair met in October 2011, when Swift invited Maya to her concert at the Jobing.com Arena in Glendale, Arizona. She wrote about her reaction when Taylor told her that she'd penned the song inspired by her blog entries, "My calmness soon turned to complete and utter frozen shock when these words came out of her mouth. 'I wrote a song for Ronan.'" Thompson added, addressing her late son, "'The tears started pouring down my cheeks as soon as I heard her say those words. But her words didn't stop there. Not only did she write a song for you, but she wanted to know if it would be alright to perform it on the nationally televised show." Swift credits Thompson as the co-writer of the song. It was released to the US iTunes Store shortly after the Stand Up to Cancer telethon ended, and all proceeds of the single go towards cancer charities.

Composition and reception
Mark Hogan of Spin magazine describes "Ronan" as a soft rock ballad. Swift wrote and produced the song based on the blog entries by co-writer Maya Thompson.

"Ronan" received universal acclaim from critics. Rolling Stone called the song "heartbreaking". Bill Dukes of Taste of Country wrote: "It was clear [Swift] was just the voice for Maya Thompson..." Ed Masley of The Arizona Republic said that "'Ronan' may very well be [Swift's] finest hour as an artist." Thompson herself, in a 2012 interview with MTV, recalled her experience listening to Swift's live rendition at Stand Up to Cancer: "Listening to it was very emotional and I was blown away by how she got it. She got it in a way that most people don't. She took the time to take the intimate parts of things I'd written and put them into the song." Thompson's portion of the proceeds from her co-writing credit went to her Ronan Thompson Foundation.

Commercial performance
"Ronan" was downloaded 220,000 times in its first week, debuting at number 2 on the Digital Song Sales chart. The song was blocked by Swift's own song "We Are Never Ever Getting Back Together" from the top spot. On the Billboard Hot 100, the song peaked at number 16. It also peaked at number 34 on the Hot Country Songs chart.

Live performances
Swift first performed the song live for Stand Up to Cancer in September 2012, and has only performed it publicly one other time, when Maya Thompson attended the Glendale, Arizona stop of The 1989 World Tour on August 17, 2015.

Charts

Certifications

"Ronan (Taylor's Version)"

Swift re-recorded "Ronan", subtitled "(Taylor's Version)", for her second re-recorded album, Red (Taylor's Version), released on November 12, 2021, through Republic Records. Prior to the re-recording, Thompson confirmed she had granted Swift permission. A lyric video for the track was confirmed through Thompson via Twitter on November 11, 2021, the day before the album was released. The video contains images and home video footage of Ronan with Thompson, provided to Swift by Thompson herself.

Charts

References

External links
 Single at Taylor Swift official site
 Maya Thompson's blog

2010s ballads
2012 songs
Charity singles
Big Machine Records singles
Songs about children
Commemoration songs
Songs written by Taylor Swift
Song recordings produced by Taylor Swift
Song recordings produced by Chris Rowe
Taylor Swift songs
American soft rock songs
Rock ballads
Works based on blogs
Songs about cancer